Ciucurova is a commune in Tulcea County, Northern Dobruja, Romania. It is composed of three villages: Atmagea, Ciucurova and Fântâna Mare (historical name: Başpunar).

The commune's name comes from Turkish, Çukurova meaning low-plain (çukur - low, ova - plain).

References

Communes in Tulcea County
Localities in Northern Dobruja
Place names of Turkish origin in Romania